(born August 23, 1987 in Okinawa, Japan) is a Japanese musician who was formerly the vocalist and songwriter for the Okinawa-based band High and Mighty Color. She was the youngest member of the band. She has an older brother who introduced her to the world of music and anime. When she performed at a concert in Okinawa in 2003, a scout for a record label noticed her and Anti Nobunaga. Mākii refused the offer at first, wanting to pursue her career in Canada as a solo artist and to master the English language, but she ultimately joined the band. In 2007, she debuted in her first film, Anata wo Wasurenai.

On July 1, 2008, it was announced that Mākii had married Dreams Come True bassist & producer Masato Nakamura on June 22 and would be leaving the band by the end of 2008. In her parting message, Mākii thanked her fellow band members and all of their fans for supporting her and the group for such a long time.

She resumed musical activities in 2013 under the stage name MAAKIII with her first single .

In 2017, she formed a new band DracoVirgo with several of her former High and Mighty Color band members.

MAAKIII voiced one of the racing teams in the video game "get REKTorized" which was released on July 7 of 2022.

Filmography

References

1987 births
Living people
Japanese women pop singers
Japanese women heavy metal singers
Japanese women rock singers
Sony Music Entertainment Japan artists
People from Okinawa Prefecture
Musicians from Okinawa Prefecture
Japanese actresses
21st-century Japanese singers
21st-century Japanese women singers
High and Mighty Color